Riffusion is a neural network, designed by Seth Forsgren and Hayk Martiros, that generates music using images of sound rather than audio. It was created as a fine-tuning of Stable Diffusion, an existing open-source model for generating images from text prompts, on spectrograms. This results in a model which uses text prompts to generate image files, which can be put through an inverse Fourier transform and converted into audio files. While these files are only several seconds long, the model can also use latent space between outputs to interpolate different files together. This is accomplished using a functionality of the Stable Diffusion model known as img2img.

The resulting music has been described as "de otro mundo", although unlikely to replace man-made music. The model was made available on December 15, 2022, with the code also freely available on GitHub. It is one of many models derived from Stable Diffusion.

Riffusion is classified within a subset of AI text-to-music generators. In December 2022, Mubert similarly used Stable Diffusion to turn descriptive text into music loops. In January 2023, Google's published a paper on their own text-to-music generator called MusicLM.

References 

Deep learning software applications
Computer music